Carina Roseingrave is a camogie player, Young Player of the Year award winner in 2008.

Career
She came to prominence with Clare as they won the All Ireland junior championship of 2008, scoring a goal in the final.

References

Living people
Clare camogie players
Year of birth missing (living people)